Liturgusidae is a family of praying mantids  in the new (2019) Neotropical superfamily Acanthopoidea.  A substantial number of genera, previously placed here, have recently been moved to the new or revived other families:
 Dactylopterygidae 
 Gonypetidae
 Epaphroditidae: subfamily Gonatistinae
 Majangidae: subfamily Majanginae
 Mantidae: subfamily Mellierinae
 Nanomantidae: subfamily Fulciniinae

Tribes and Genera 
The  Mantodea Species File now lists two tribes, containing the following genera:
tribe Hagiomantini
 Hagiomantis Serville, 1839
tribe Liturgusini
 Corticomantis Svenson, 2014 - monotypic (Corticomantis atricoxata (Beier, 1931))
 Fuga Svenson, 2014
 Liturgusa Saussure, 1869 (lichen mantises)
 Velox Svenson, 2014 - monotypic (Velox wielandi Svenson, 2014)

References

 Spermatophore feeding and mating behaviour in praying mantids (Mantodea: Liturgusidae), G. I. Holwell, Department of Biological Sciences, Macquarie University, NSW, Australia

External links 
 
 

 
Mantodea families
Taxa named by Ermanno Giglio-Tos
Mantodea subfamilies